Aurora is a city in Center Township, Dearborn County, Indiana, United States. The population was 3,750 at the 2010 census.

Geography
Aurora is located at  (39.058551, -84.906351).

History
Aurora was platted in 1819. It was named for Aurora, the goddess of dawn in Roman mythology. Aurora was incorporated in 1848.

Aurora is known for its historic downtown area and the ornate Hillforest mansion built for Thomas Gaff who earned his fortune shipping goods on the Ohio River by steamboat. The mansion was designed by architect Isaiah Rogers and was completed in 1855 in the Italian Renaissance style. The design is symmetrical. Details include deep overhangs, arched windows and balconies and porches.  Hillforest was declared a National Historic Landmark in 1992.

In addition to Hillforest, the Aurora City Hall, Aurora Methodist Episcopal Church, Aurora Public Library, Downtown Aurora Historic District, First Evangelical United Church of Christ, First Presbyterian Church, George Street Bridge, Lewis Hurlbert, Sr. House, Leive, Parks and Stapp Opera House, Levi Stevens House, and George Sutton Medical Office are listed on the National Register of Historic Places.

Demographics

2010 census
As of the 2010 census, there were 3,750 people, 1,472 households, and 936 families living in the city. The racial makeup of the city was 97.5% White, 0.5% African American, 0.3% Native American, 0.3% Asian, 0.5% from other races, and 0.7% from two or more races. Hispanic or Latino of any race were 1.5% of the population.

There were 1,472 households, of which 35.1% had children under the age of 18 living with them, 42.3% were married couples living together, 15.1% had a female householder with no husband present, 6.1% had a male householder with no wife present, and 36.4% were non-families. 29.1% of all households were made up of individuals, and 11.6% had someone living alone who was 65 years of age or older. The average household size was 2.55 and the average family size was 3.11.

The median age in the city was 36.2 years. 26.6% of residents were under the age of 18; 8.7% were between the ages of 18 and 24; 26.5% were from 25 to 44; 25.3% were from 45 to 64; and 12.9% were 65 years of age or older. The gender makeup of the city was 49.3% male and 50.7% female.

2000 census
As of the 2000 census, there were 3,965 people, 1,592 households, and 1,022 families living in the city. The racial makeup of the city was 98.59% White, 0.10% African American, 0.33% Native American, 0.15% Asian, 0.25% from other races, and 0.58% from two or more races. Hispanic or Latino of any race were 0.61% of the population.

There were 1,592 households, out of which 31.8% had children under the age of 18 living with them, 47.4% were married couples living together, 12.2% had a female householder with no husband present, and 35.8% were non-families. 29.7% of all households were made up of individuals, and 11.7% had someone living alone who was 65 years of age or older. The average household size was 2.48 and the average family size was 3.08.

In the city, the population was spread out, with 26.9% under the age of 18, 9.1% from 18 to 24, 30.7% from 25 to 44, 20.3% from 45 to 64, and 13.1% who were 65 years of age or older. The median age was 35 years. For every 100 females, there were 96.2 males. For every 100 females age 18 and over, there were 91.8 males.

The median income for a household in the city was $32,500, and the median income for a family was $39,331. Males had a median income of $32,058 versus $24,671 for females. The per capita income for the city was $16,587. About 9.4% of families and 10.4% of the population were below the poverty line, including 11.3% of those under age 18 and 12.3% of those age 65 or over.

Government
The government consists of a mayor and a city council. The mayor is elected in citywide vote. The city council consists of five members. Four are elected from individual districts. One is elected at-large.

Current elected officials

 Mayor: Mark A. Drury
 Clerk Treasurer: Benny Turner
 Council District 1: John Borgman
 Council District 2: Joey Turner
 Council District 3: Terry Hahn
 Council District 4: Fred Lester
 Council At Large: Patrick Schwing

Timeline of 19th-century mayors

Education
The town has a free lending library, the Aurora Public Library District.

Notable people
 Jesse Lynch Holman (1774-1842) - Helped plat the town of Aurora in 1819. Helped establish the First Baptist Church of Aurora in 1820 and the Indiana Bible Society in 1831. Helped found Aurora's public library and served as the superintendent for Dearborn County schools. Appointed by President Andrew Jackson to the U.S. District Court for the District of Indiana.
 William S. Holman (1822-1897) - Born in Aurora at Veraestau, the home built by his father, Jesse Lynch Holman. He was elected to 10 terms in the United States House of Representatives.
 John Q. Tufts (1840-1902) -  Born in Aurora in 1840, his family moved to Iowa in 1852.  He was elected as a Republican to represent Iowa's 2nd congressional district in the United States House of Representatives.
 Elias Selah Holliday (1842-1936) - Served 4 terms in the United States House of Representatives from Indiana's 5th congressional district.
 Kirtley Baker (1869-1927) - Major League Baseball player.
 Harry Emerson Rowbottom (1884-1934) - Served 3 terms in the United States House of Representatives from Indiana's 1st congressional district.
 Elmer Davis (1890-1958) - Director of the Office of War Information in World War II; Peabody Award recipient.
 Stephen Bechtel Sr. (1900-1989) - Former president of Bechtel Corporation, currently the largest construction company, and the 8th largest privately held corporation, in the United States.
 Anna Meyer (Born 1928) - At age 15, one of the youngest players to sign a contract with the All-American Girls Professional Baseball League.
 Lonnie Mack (1941-2016), an influential rock guitar soloing pioneer, was born and raised in the area, and is buried in Aurora.

See also
 Hillforest
 Veraestau
 List of cities and towns along the Ohio River
 Lochry's Defeat

References

External links

 City of Aurora, Indiana website

Cities in Indiana
Cities in Dearborn County, Indiana
Indiana populated places on the Ohio River
1819 establishments in Indiana
Populated places established in 1819
Sundown towns in Indiana